Fitchburg High School is a public high school in Fitchburg, Massachusetts. The school is part of the Fitchburg Public Schools district.

History
Fitchburg High School has existed in some capacity since 1830, when its first schoolhouse was constructed. However, the school was officially established in 1849 under the leadership of its first principal, Anson S. Marshall. Fitchburg High is recorded as the seventy-third oldest active public high school in the United States. Due to ever growing enrollment, a new structure was built in 1869 and was designed by a local architect named Elbridge Boyden.

Notably, in the 1874–1875 school year, Henry P. Armsby taught at Fitchburg High.

In 1937, the longest-lasting Fitchburg High building was erected at 98 Academy Street, and the school operated there until the 1999–2000 academic year. That building was converted into use for Longsjo Middle School in 2009. Fitchburg High then moved the northern part of town, near its border with Ashby.

In 1962, the Fitchburg High Marching Band participated as one of a select few high school bands in the Rose Parade, an annual parade following the Rose Bowl Game. It is the only time the school has participated.

Athletics
Known as the Red Raiders, athletic teams of Fitchburg High School don the colors of maroon and white. The school primarily uses Crocker Field for football and track and field, while the Wallace Civic Center is used for ice hockey games. The Doug Grutchfield Field House, named after a former athletic director of the school, hosts basketball, volleyball, and indoor track and field events.

Fitchburg High has one of the longest-standing high school football rivalries in the United States with nearby Leominster High School, known as "The Rivalry." The first game between the two teams was played on October 20, 1894, and has since played annually on Thanksgiving. The match is also referred to by locals as the "Turkey Bowl." As of 2021, the series record is 69–61–10, in favor of Leominster.

Notable coaches of the Fitchburg High football team history include Walt Dubzinski, Dennis Gildea, and Cleo A. O'Donnell.

Demographics
According to U.S. News & World Report in 2021, the Fitchburg High School student body is nearly half Hispanic and nearly a third White, with smaller percentages of African American and Asian students.

Notable alumni

Aldrich Bowker, actor
James L. Conrad (1918), former president of Nichols College
Frank Wesley Fenno Jr., United States Navy officer
Mary Graustein, professor of mathematics at Radcliffe College
Christian Hansen Jr. (1949), U.S. Marshal for Vermont
George Juskalian (1932), United States Army officer
Robert Niemi (1973), author
Eleanor Norcross (1870), painter
Francis H. Snow, chancellor of the University of Kansas
Dean Tran, politician
Nathan A. Tufts, politician

See also
List of high school football rivalries more than 100 years old
List of high schools in Massachusetts
List of the oldest public high schools in the United States

References

External links
 

Educational institutions established in 1849
Schools in Worcester County, Massachusetts
Public high schools in Massachusetts